Carolina Valdivia Torres (born 7 March 1978) is a Chilean lawyer who served as caretaker Minister of Foreign Affairs after Andrés Allamand's resignation.

References

External links
 

1978 births
Living people
21st-century Chilean politicians
21st-century Chilean women politicians
Complutense University of Madrid alumni
Foreign ministers of Chile
People from Santiago
Pontifical Catholic University of Chile alumni
Women government ministers of Chile